Roade was a railway station serving the Northamptonshire village of the same name on the West Coast Main Line. Roade Station opened in 1838 as the principal station for Northampton (which the main line had bypassed), but its importance diminished upon the opening of the Northampton and Peterborough Railway in 1845. The construction of the Northampton Loop Line in 1875 made Roade a junction station, and it survived until 1964.

History

The station for Northampton
The London and Birmingham Railway (L&B) opened Roade station in 1838 as part of its line from London to Birmingham. It lost this status in 1845 when the L&B opened a branch linking Northampton and Peterborough allowing services to run directly into Northampton from Blisworth. This had an immediate effect on Roade: the refreshment room was removed by 1865, while the daily stopping services fell to seven.

Northampton Loop Line

The direct route to Rugby was increased to two tracks and a two-track direct main line link to Rugby via Northampton (known as the Northampton Loop Line) was added. This deviates from the L&B line at Roade, running through Northampton to rejoin the main line at Rugby, where four track running resumed. Roade, by then a junction for fast trains north as well as services through Northampton, saw its facilities considerably enlarged to include three platforms. In 1881, the station was resited 200m to the south of a bridge carrying the Northampton to London road over the line.

East and West Junction Railway
In 1890-91 a new east–west single-track line – the East and West Junction Railway (E&WJR) – was built across Roade and, although there was initially no connection between the two lines, the LNWR agreed to the construction of a single line connecting spur ( long) which made a junction with its main line on the down side just to the south of Roade station. The spur saw its first use on 13 April 1891 with a goods working. The spur soon became an important means of exchanging coal and minerals with the LNWR which was charging as much as £50 per half year for its use. Although the LNWR had refused a request to allow passenger services on the spur, the line did run into a bay platform at Roade. Sidings were installed at Roade in 1909 to handle the E&WJR's limestone traffic. The spur became less important with the formation of the Stratford-upon-Avon and Midland Junction Railway and the strengthening of the connection with the main line at Blisworth. The spur was eventually closed in May 1917, the southern part being retained as a siding.

Closure
Roade station was reprieved from closure in 1959 due to the efforts of local MP Sir Frank Markham, remaining open until 1964. The West Coast Main Line and Northampton Loop Line were rebuilt as a 25 kV. overhead electrified route. The footbridge and platforms were demolished but the ticket office building survived in various uses for several years until it was also demolished in 2013.

Routes

Present day 
The West Coast Main Line runs through the site of the station, no traces remain.

See also 

 Roade cutting

External links
 Roade station on 1954 one-inch (1:63,360) OS map No chord connecting the lines is shown but...
 Buckinghamshire IV.NW (includes: Ashton; Grafton Regis; Hartwell; Roade; Stoke Bruerne (1900, six-inch or 1:10,560) shows the chord clearly.

References

Disused railway stations in Northamptonshire
Former London and Birmingham Railway stations
Railway stations in Great Britain opened in 1838
Railway stations in Great Britain closed in 1964
Beeching closures in England
West Northamptonshire District